Pilgaard is a surname. Notable people with the surname include:

 Claus Pilgaard (born 1965), Danish musician and entertainer
 Hans Pilgaard (born 1963), Danish journalist and television host
 Petter Pilgaard (born 1980), Norwegian television celebrity
 Ulf Pilgaard (born 1940), Danish actor